Songs of Patience is the second full studio album by alternative rock band Alberta Cross.

Reception

Songs of Patience received mixed reviews. At Metacritic, which assigns a normalized rating out of 100 to reviews from mainstream critics, the album received an average score of 65 based on 11 reviews, indicating "generally favorable reviews."

Track listing

References

2012 albums
Alberta Cross albums
ATO Records albums